Zręcin  is a village in the administrative district of Gmina Chorkówka, within Krosno County, Subcarpathian Voivodeship, in south-eastern Poland.

The village has an approximate population of 2,000.

Polish inventor Ignacy Łukasiewicz is buried at the local cemetery.

References

Villages in Krosno County